Vanja Ilić may refer to:

 Vanja Ilić (handballer) (born 1993), Serbian handball player
 Vanja Ilić (swimmer) (1927–2018), Yugoslav swimmer